Colonel James Graves Kelly (28 November 1843 – 20 June 1923) was an officer in the British Indian Army. He served in the Hazara Expedition, Miranzai Expedition and most famously in the Chitral Expedition.

References

1843 births
1923 deaths
British military personnel of the Chitral Expedition
British Indian Army officers
British Indian Army personnel